Alighiero is a given name. Notable people with the name include:

 Alighiero di Bellincione (c. 1210–1283), father of Dante Alighieri
 Alighiero Boetti (1940–1994), Italian conceptual artist
 Italo Alighiero Chiusano (1926–1995), Italian independent writer, literary critic, Germanist, literary historian, essayist, author of dramas, and journalist
 Alighiero Guglielmi (1912–1988), Italian racewalker
 Alighiero Noschese (1932–1979), Italian comedian

See also
 Carlo Alighiero (1927–2021), Italian actor, director, and playwright
 Dante Alighieri (1265–1321), Italian poet, writer, and philosopher